Alemannic (Alamannic) or Alamanni may refer to:
 Alemannic German, a group of Upper German dialects
 Alemanni, a confederation of Suebian Germanic tribes in the Roman period
 Alamanni (surname)

See also
Alemannia (disambiguation)
Alemannic separatism
Allemand (disambiguation)